Jusayr was a Palestinian Arab village in the Gaza Subdistrict. It was depopulated during the 1948 Arab-Israeli War on July 17, 1948, under Operation Barak or Operation Yo'av. It was located 35 km northeast of Gaza.

History
Ceramics from the  Byzantine  era have been found here.

Ottoman era
In 1517, Jusayr   was incorporated into the Ottoman Empire with the rest of Palestine, and in 1596 the village appeared in the Ottoman tax registers as being in the nahiya (subdistrict) of Gaza under the Liwa of Gaza. It had a population of 60 household; an estimated population of 330. The whole population was Muslim. It paid a fixed tax rate of 25% on a number of crops, including wheat, barley, summer crops, vineyards, fruit trees, goats, beehives, as well as on "occasional revenues"; a total of 12,180  Akçe.

In 1838, Edward Robinson   noted el Juseir as a Muslim village, located in the Gaza district.

In 1863  Victor Guérin visited the village, which he found to have 500 inhabitants,  while an Ottoman  village list from about 1870 found that the village had  a population of 296, in a total of  119  houses, though the population count included men, only.

In 1883 the PEF's Survey of Western Palestine (SWP) described it as being an adobe  village on flat ground.

British Mandate era
In the 1922 census of Palestine conducted by the British Mandate authorities,  Jusayr had a population of 579 inhabitants, all Muslims, increasing in the 1931 census to 839 Muslims,  in a total of 246  houses.

By the 1945 statistics,  Jusayr had a population of 1180 Muslims,  with a total of 12,361   dunams of land, according to an official land and population survey.  Of this, 11,852  dunams were used   for cereals, while 54 dunams were built-up land.

Jusayr had an elementary school for boys which was founded in 1937, and by 1945, it had  74 students.

Post 1948
In 1992 the village site was described: "One concrete, flat-roofed house still stands in the middle of a peach orchard. Its front facade has two rectangular windows and a rectangular entrance in the middle. The debris of houses among tall grasses and weeds is visible. A garbage dump is now located on the site, as well as buildings that belong to an Israeli settlement. The surrounding lands are cultivated."

References

Bibliography

  
 
 

 
 
  
 
  
 (pp. 258-9, 414)
Nasser, G.A (1955/1973):  "Memoirs" in Journal of Palestine Studies 
 "Memoirs of the First Palestine War”" no. 2 (Win. 73): 3-32], pdf-file, downloadable

External links
Welcome To Jusayr
Jusayr, Zochrot
Survey of Western Palestine, Map 20:   IAA, Wikimedia commons 
 Jusayr, from the Khalil Sakakini Cultural Center

Arab villages depopulated during the 1948 Arab–Israeli War
District of Gaza